Mir Musavvir (fl. 1510–48, died 1555) was a Persian painter at the Safavid court at Tabriz and later the Mughal court at Kabul. During his time at the royal Safavid workshop, he contributed to the Shahnameh of Shah Tahmasp. He was the father of Mir Sayyid Ali, who adopted his occupation of painting. 

Mir Musavvir moved to Tabriz from Badakhshan. The regional source of his style is evident in his illustrations from the 1520s, for example the painting "Ardashir and the Slave Girl Gulnar" of 1527–8 that he produced for the Shahnameh of Shah Tahmasp; the compositions are carefully constructed, with much attention given to architectural elements and the accurate depiction of objects such as lamps, bowls and ewers. By the 1530s, however, as part of the synthesis of eastern and western Iranian styles of painting, Mir Musavvir’s illustrations became “more broadly conceived and dramatic” and ceased to contain an abundance of minute details.  

As well as manuscript illustrations, Mir Musavvir produced single-page paintings to be included in albums known as Muraqqas, for example the portrait “Sarkhan Beg the Table-steward”.  

By November 1549, Mir Musavvir and his son Mir Sayyid Ali had left Iran for the Mughal court at Kabul. Shah Tahmasp I was likely willing to release them only because he himself was no longer actively patronizing them.

According to the contemporary chronicler Dust Muhammad, Mir Musavvir and Aqa Mirak worked together closely in service to the Safavid royal library, producing wall paintings for the palace of Prince Sam Mirza and illustrations for the royal manuscript of the Khamsa of Nizami of 1539–43. Mir Musavvir's signature is on a courtier's turban in the painting "Manuchihr Enthroned" of the Shahnameh of Shah Tahmasp, and a verse couplet written in the iwan depicted in the illustration "Nushirwan and the Owls" of the 1539–43 Khamsa manuscript attributes the painting to Mir Musavvir and dates it to 1539–40.

References

Persian miniature painters
1576 deaths
Year of birth unknown
16th-century Iranian painters